Sea legs may refer to:

 Illusions of self-motion, felt on dry land after spending time at sea
 Sea Legs, a 1937 Broadway musical
 Sea Legs (film), starring Jack Oakie and Lillian Roth
 "Sea Legs" (song), by The Shins on their 2007 album Wincing the Night Away
 "Sea Legs", a song by Frank Turner from the 2007 EP The Real Damage
 "Sea Legs", a song by Run the Jewels from the 2013 album Run the Jewels
 "Sea Legs", a song by Spirit Caravan from the 1999 album Jug Fulla Sun
 Sea Legs, an EP by Samantha Shelton
 Sealegs Amphibious Craft, a brand of amphibious vehicle
 Sea Legs, a brand name of antihistamine drug Meclozine